Ahmed Rami may refer to:

 Ahmed Rami (poet) (1892–1981), Egyptian poet
 Ahmed Rami (writer) (born 1946), Swedish-Moroccan writer and Holocaust denier